The following is a list of serial killers i.e. a person who murders more than one person, in two or more separate events over a period of time, for primarily psychological reasons who began committing their crimes before 1900. This list does not include mass murderers, spree killers, war criminals, members of democidal governments, or major political figures, such as Adolf Hitler, Francisco Franco, Hideki Tojo, Suharto, Mao Zedong, Joseph Stalin, or Pol Pot.  This list is chronological by default, but can be re-ordered using the button at the top of each column.

Table of serial killers before 1900

Unconfirmed serial killers 
The existence of the following serial killers is dubious or contradicts the accepted historical record:

See also
 List of serial killers by country
 List of serial killers by number of victims

References

serial killers
Serial killers before 1900
Serial killers before 1900